Platanistidae is a family of river dolphins containing the extant Ganges river dolphin and Indus river dolphin (both in the genus Platanista) but also extinct relatives from marine deposits in the Neogene.

The Amazon river dolphin, Yangtze river dolphin, and franciscana were once thought to belong to Platanistidae (e.g. Simpson, 1945), but cladistic and DNA studies beginning in the 1990s showed that the former three taxa are more closely related to Delphinoidea than to the South Asian river dolphin. The extinct odontocete families Allodelphinidae and Squalodelphinidae are closely related to Platanistidae. Fossils from this clade have been found in deposits in North and South America, Europe, and Central Asia.

References

Mammal families
Dolphins
Taxa named by John Edward Gray